This is a list of football clubs that compete within the leagues and divisions of the men's English football league system as far down as Level 10, that is to say, six divisions below the English Football League. Also included are clubs from outside England that play within the English system (suitably highlighted). The relative levels of divisions can be compared on the English football league system page.

List of Leagues and Divisions
Premier League (Level 1)
English Football League - Championship (Level 2), League One (Level 3), League Two (Level 4)
National League (Level 5/Step 1)
National League North / South (Level 6/Step 2)
Isthmian League Premier (Level 7/Step 3), One North / One South Central / One South East (Level 8/Step 4)
Northern Premier League Premier (Level 7/Step 3), One East / One Midlands / One West (Level 8/Step 4)
Southern Football League Premier Central / Premier South (Level 7/Step 3), One Central / One South (Level 8/Step 4)
Below these are the Regional Feeders:
Combined Counties Football League Premier North / Premier South (Level 9/Step 5), One (Level 10/Step 6)
Eastern Counties Football League Premier (Level 9/Step 5), One North / One South (Level 10/Step 6)
Essex Senior Football League (Level 9/Step 5 only)
Hellenic Football League Premier (Level 9/Step 5), One (Level 10/Step 6)
Midland Football League Premier (Level 9/Step 5), One (Level 10/Step 6)
North West Counties Football League Premier (Level 9/Step 5), One North / One South (Level 10/Step 6)
Northern Counties East Football League Premier (Level 9/Step 5), One (Level 10/Step 6)
Northern Football League One (Level 9/Step 5), Two (Level 10/Step 6)
Southern Combination Football League Premier (Level 9/Step 5), One (Level 10/Step 6), Two (Level 11/Step 7)
Southern Counties East Football League Premier (Level 9/Step 5), One (Level 10/Step 6)
South West Peninsula League Premier East / Premier West (Level 10/Step 6 only)
Spartan South Midlands Football League Premier (Level 9/Step 5), One (Level 10/Step 6)
United Counties League Premier North / Premier South (Level 9/Step 5), One (Level 10/Step 6)
Wessex Football League Premier (Level 9/Step 5), One (Level 10/Step 6)
Western Football League Premier (Level 9/Step 5), One (Level 10/Step 6)

Alphabetical list of Clubs
The divisions are correct for the 2022–23 season.

Key



0–9

A

B

C

D

E

F

Notes:
(IM) Isle of Man club playing in the English Football system.

G

Notes:
(CI) Channel Islands club playing in the English Football system.

H

I

J

Notes:
(CI) Channel Islands club playing in the English Football system.

K

L

M

Notes:
(WE) Welsh club playing in the English Football system.

N

Notes:
(WE) Welsh club playing in the English Football system.

O

P

Q

R

S

Notes:
(WE) Welsh club playing in the English Football system.

T

U

V

W

Notes:
(WE) Welsh club playing in the English Football system.

Y

Clubs in Levels 1–10 last season

See also
 List of former Football League clubs
 List of football clubs in England by major honours won

External links
Football Club History Database

 
England
Football clubs in England